Terron Millett (born June 28, 1968) is an American former professional boxer who competed from 1993 to 2003, holding the IBF light welterweight title from 1999 to 2000. As an amateur, he was a National Golden Gloves champion.

Amateur career
Millett was the 1991 National Golden Gloves Light welterweight champion.

Professional career
Millett made his professional debut in 1993, defeating Louis Saucedo. He won the IBF light welterweight title on February 20, 1999, upsetting Vince Phillips via fifth-round technical knockout (TKO) at Madison Square Garden. He defended the title against Virgil McClendon, courtesy of a 12th-round TKO, but was stripped of his belt.

References

External links

Boxers from Colorado
International Boxing Federation champions
Welterweight boxers
1968 births
Living people
American male boxers
Sportspeople from Colorado Springs, Colorado
World light-welterweight boxing champions